Peter Arnold Vogler (born 10 September 1964 in Ipswich, Queensland) is an Australian baseball coach and former player.

Vogler represented Australia in the 1988 and 1996 Olympic Games.

Vogler's father Brian represented Australia in the 1956 Olympic football competition.

In 2016 Vogler was inducted into the Australian Baseball Hall of Fame.

References

1964 births
Olympic baseball players of Australia
Australian baseball players
Baseball players at the 1988 Summer Olympics
Baseball players at the 1996 Summer Olympics
Living people
Sportspeople from Ipswich, Queensland